Events from the year 1977 in South Korea.

Incumbents
President: Park Chung-hee 
Prime Minister: Choi Kyu-hah

Events
 June 25 – Hyundai Mobis was founded, as predecessor name was Hyundai Precision & Industries.
 August Unknown date – A first Hyundai Department Store open in Ulsan, as predecessor name was Ulsan Shopping Center.
 November 11 – According to MLIT of ROK official confirm announced, 59 persons perished, 1343 persons were hurt of Iri station explosion in Iksan, Jeollanam-do.

Births

 15 March - Yoon Hye-Young, archer
 25 July - Jo Hyeon-jeong, voice actress
 9 September - Chae Jung-an, actress and singer
 31 December - Psy, singer-songwriter

See also
List of South Korean films of 1977
Years in Japan
Years in North Korea

References

 
South Korea
Years of the 20th century in South Korea
1970s in South Korea
South Korea